Henniker may refer to: 

 Baron Henniker, a barony in County Wicklow, Ireland
 Henniker baronets
 John Henniker, 1st Baron Henniker (1724-1803), British Member of Parliament
 Charles Henniker-Major, 6th Baron Henniker (1872-1956)
 Henniker, New Hampshire, United States, New England town named for John Henniker
 Henniker (CDP), New Hampshire, United States, the main village in the town of Henniker